William Ross, Baron Ross of Marnock,  (7 April 1911 – 10 June 1988) was the longest serving Secretary of State for Scotland, holding office from 1964 to 1970 and again from 1974-76, throughout the premiership of Harold Wilson.

Early life and military career
Born in Ayr, the son of a train driver, he was educated at Ayr Academy and the University of Glasgow and became a schoolteacher before World War II. He served in the Highland Light Infantry in India, Burma and Singapore and was then a major in Lord Louis Mountbatten's headquarters in Ceylon (now Sri Lanka).  At one point he guarded Rudolf Hess. He became a Member of the Order of the British Empire in 1945.

Politics
After unsuccessfully contesting Ayr Burghs at the 1945 general election, Ross was elected Member of Parliament for Kilmarnock in a by-election in 1946. He was Parliamentary Private Secretary to Hector McNeil during his tenure as Secretary of State for Scotland and in 1954 placed an amendment to the bill on the licensing of commercial television, advocating a ban on adverts on Sundays, Good Friday and Christmas Day.

After serving as Shadow Secretary of State from 1962, he became Secretary of State for Scotland in 1964 under Harold Wilson. The Conservatives were in government from 1970-74, when Ross resumed his position until he lost office when Wilson resigned in 1976. During his tenure, he was responsible for the creation of the Highlands and Islands Development Board and the Scottish Development Agency, the forerunners of Highlands and Islands Enterprise and Scottish Enterprise respectively. Ross campaigned for a "No" vote in the 1975 referendum on British membership of the EEC. He was also a firm unionist, in favour of Scotland and Northern Ireland remaining in the United Kingdom, and opposed devolution. Journalist Andrew Marr has called him "a stern-faced and authoritarian Presbyterian conservative who ran the country like a personal fiefdom for Harold Wilson". Ross coined the term "Tartan Tories" to describe the members of the Scottish National Party, whom he very much disliked; he was himself nicknamed "the hammer of the Nats" for his many attacks on them. The nickname "Tartan Tories" is still used in the present day by some left-leaning critics of the SNP.

He represented Kilmarnock until the 1979 general election, when he was created a life peer as  Baron Ross of Marnock, of Kilmarnock in the District of Kilmarnock and Loudoun.

Ross was occasionally depicted by newspaper cartoonists as a boy in dungarees seated on an upturned bucket, as a reference to the Scottish cartoon character Oor Wullie.

He was Lord High Commissioner to the General Assembly of the Church of Scotland from 1978-80, and became Honorary President of the Scottish Football Association in 1978. He married Elizabeth Jane Elma Aitkenhead, daughter of John Aitkenhead in 1948 and the couple had two daughters. He died of cancer in 1988.
Lady Ross lived to the age of 94 and died in 2018.

Notes

References
 Torrance, David, The Scottish Secretaries (Birlinn 2006)

External links
 

|-

|-

1911 births
1988 deaths
Alumni of the University of Glasgow
Highland Light Infantry officers
Scottish Labour MPs
Labour Party (UK) life peers
Lords High Commissioner to the General Assembly of the Church of Scotland
Members of the Order of the British Empire
Members of the Privy Council of the United Kingdom
People from South Ayrshire
Secretaries of State for Scotland
UK MPs 1945–1950
UK MPs 1950–1951
UK MPs 1951–1955
UK MPs 1955–1959
UK MPs 1959–1964
UK MPs 1964–1966
UK MPs 1966–1970
UK MPs 1970–1974
UK MPs 1974
UK MPs 1974–1979
People educated at Ayr Academy
British Army personnel of World War II
Ministers in the Wilson governments, 1964–1970
Life peers created by Elizabeth II